Paea Okalani Fa'anunu (born 4 November 1988) is a Tongan rugby union player. He plays in the prop position for the France based Top 14 side, Castres. Fa'anunu also represents Tonga at international level.

Fa'anunu played for Canterbury in the ITM Cup. His performances at domestic level had seen him named in the  wider training squad for the 2013 Super Rugby season. He made his international debut against Italy on 8 November 2014.

Honours

Club 
 Castres
Top 14: 2017–18

References

External links 
 
 

Living people
1988 births
New Zealand rugby union players
Rugby union props
Canterbury rugby union players
Auckland rugby union players
Montpellier Hérault Rugby players
Castres Olympique players
US Dax players
New Zealand expatriate rugby union players
New Zealand expatriate sportspeople in France
Expatriate rugby union players in France
Tonga international rugby union players
Rugby union players from Auckland